Caroline Glover is the chef at the restaurant Annette which she founded in 2016 in Aurora, Colorado.  The restaurant is named after her great aunt Annette, nicknamed Nettsie, who often visited Glover and her family in College Station, Texas.

Career
She graduated from the Culinary Institute of America in Hyde Park, New York and then worked on the line at Greenwich Village’s The Spotted Pig.  She was promoted to Sous Chef under April Bloomfield and executive chef Nate Smith. She worked in farming for a short time and then at Acorn, a restaurant in Denver, Colorado.

Awards and honors
Glover is the winner of the 2022 James Beard award for Best Chef in the Mountain Chef. in 2019, Food & Wine named Glover one of the year’s Best New Chefs.  Bon Appétit named Annette one of 50 Best New Restaurants in the USA.

References

Living people
American women chefs
Culinary Institute of America Hyde Park alumni
James Beard Foundation Award winners
Restaurant founders
Year of birth missing (living people)
People from Aurora, Colorado